The men's 400 metres hurdles at the 1950 European Athletics Championships was held in Brussels, Belgium, at Heysel Stadium on 24, 26, and 27 August 1950.

Medalists

Results

Final
27 August

Semi-finals
26 August

Semi-final 1

Semi-final 2

Heats
24 August

Heat 1

Heat 2

Heat 3

Heat 4

Participation
According to an unofficial count, 20 athletes from 13 countries participated in the event.

 (1)
 (2)
 (1)
 (2)
 (1)
 (2)
 (1)
 (1)
 (2)
 (2)
 (2)
 (2)
 (1)

References

400 metres hurdles
400 metres hurdles at the European Athletics Championships